Qaraqan Saatlı (also, Qarağan Saatlı, Karagan Saatly, and Karagansaat) is a village in the Agdash Rayon of Azerbaijan. The village forms part of the municipality of Şəmsabad.

References 

Populated places in Agdash District